This page details the records, statistics, and career achievements of American professional basketball player Russell Westbrook. Westbrook plays the point guard position for the Utah Jazz of the National Basketball Association (NBA).

NBA career statistics
Statistics are correct as of the 2016–17 season.

Regular season

Playoffs

Career-highs

Awards and accomplishments

NBA Most Valuable Player: 2017
2x NBA scoring champion: 2015, 2017
5x NBA games played leader: 2009, 2010, 2011, 2012, 2013
9x All-NBA selection:
First team: 2016, 2017
Second team: 2011, 2012, 2013, 2015, 2018
Third team: 2019, 2020
9x NBA All-Star: 2011, 2012, 2013, 2015, 2016, 2017, 2018, 2019, 2020
2x NBA All-Star Game MVP: 2015, 2016
NBA All-Rookie selection:
First team: 2009
7x NBA Western Conference Player of the Month
15x NBA Western Conference Player of the Week
2x NBA Western Conference Rookie of the Month
NBA Fan Award Best Style

United States National game
Olympic medalist:
 Gold: 2012
FIBA World Cup medalist:
Gold: 2010
Olympic Basketball player of the year 2012
Best Comeback Athlete ESPY Award 2014

College
Pac-10 Defensive Player of the Year: 2008
Best Dressed NBA player- 2017-2018

NBA achievements

Regular season 
 1st Place All Time for triple-doubles in a single season with 42.
 1st Place All Time for consecutive games with a triple double (11) (1/22/19-2/14/19).
 1st Place All Time for 50-point triple-doubles in a single season with 3.
 2nd Place All Time for points scored in a triple-double with 57 (3/29/2017 against Orlando Magic).
 Only player in NBA history to average a triple-double throughout three consecutive seasons.
 Only player in NBA history to average a triple double in four out of five seasons.
 Only player in NBA history to win the scoring title, MVP award, and average a triple-double in the same season.
 Only player in NBA history to win consecutive NBA All-Star Game MVP awards, without sharing either.
 Only player in NBA history to average 40 points, 12 rebounds, and 11 assists over a 5-game span.
 Only player in NBA history to win the scoring title and average at least 10 assists the following season.
 Only player in NBA history to have at least 100 points, 30 rebounds and 30 assists through his team's first three games of a season.
 Only player in NBA history to record a triple-double without missing a free throw or field goal (3/22/2017 against Philadelphia 76ers).
 Only player in NBA history to record five consecutive 30-point triple-doubles in a season.  
 Only player in NBA history to have two streaks of seven consecutive triple-doubles in a single season.  
 Only player in NBA history to record at least 50 points, 10 rebounds, and 10 assists three times in a single season.
 Only player in NBA history to record at least 45 points, 10 rebounds, and 10 assists four times in a single season.
 Only player in NBA history to record at least 40 points, 10 rebounds, and 10 assists eight times in a single season.
 Only player in NBA history to record at least 35 points, 10 rebounds, and 10 assists sixteen times in a single season.
 Only player in NBA history to record at least 11 rebounds and 24 assists in a game.
 One of two players in NBA history to record at least 40 triple-doubles in a season.
 Includes Oscar Robertson.  
 One of two players in NBA history to average at least 31.2 points, 9.1 rebounds and 10.3 assists in a calendar month.
 Includes Oscar Robertson.
 One of two players in NBA history to record at least 30 points, 17 assists, 11 rebounds, and 4 steals in a game.
 Includes Magic Johnson.
 One of two players in NBA history to record at least 120 points, 40 rebounds, and 30 assists over three consecutive games.
 Includes Wilt Chamberlain.
 One of two players in NBA history average at least 33 points, 10 rebounds, and 10 assists over a 10-game span.
 Includes Michael Jordan.
 One of two players in NBA history to average at least 23 points, 10 assists, and 7 rebounds in a single season.
 Includes Oscar Robertson (achieved this four times).
 One of two players in NBA history to average a triple-double throughout an entire season.
 Includes Oscar Robertson.
 One of three players in NBA history to record at least 40 points, 10 rebounds, and 10 assists in consecutive games.
 Includes Michael Jordan and Pete Maravich.
 One of four players in NBA history to record at least 51 points, 13 rebounds, and 10 assists in a game.
 Includes Wilt Chamberlain (achieved this twice), James Harden and Elgin Baylor.
 One of four players in NBA history to record five triple-doubles in six games.
 Includes Wilt Chamberlain, Oscar Robertson, and Michael Jordan.

Playoffs 
Highest scoring triple-double in NBA playoff history (51 points on 4/20/2017 vs Houston Rockets).Only player in NBA history to record a 50-point triple-double in an NBA playoff game.Only player in NBA history to record at least 150 points, 50 rebounds, and 50 assists through the first five games of a playoff series.Only player in NBA history to record at least three straight 30-point triple-doubles in a single playoff series.
 One of two players in NBA history to record at least 25 points and 15 assists in back-to-back playoff games.
 Includes Isiah Thomas.One of two players in NBA history to record three straight 30-point triple-doubles.
 Includes Wilt Chamberlain.
 One of three players in NBA history to record at least 25 points, 15 assists, and 10 rebounds in a playoff game.
 Includes Oscar Robertson (achieved this twice) and Chris Paul.

 Set With Kevin Durant 

 They finished the 2015–16 regular season with combined totals of 3,907 points, 1,215 rebounds and 1,195 assists. No other pair of teammates in NBA history has combined to produce as many points, rebounds and assists in one season. T-1st place all-time for most combined points in a game by teammates who were both making their NBA Finals debut.
 Durant and Westbrook scored 36 points and 27 points, respectively, in Game 1 of the 2012 NBA Finals.
 Tied with Julius Erving's 33 and Doug Collins' 30 points in Game 1 of the 1977 NBA Finals.
 2nd place all-time for most playoff games by a duo with at least 25 points each in the same game with 34.
 Behind Jerry West and Elgin Baylor.
 Only pair of teammates in NBA history to each have at least 30 points, 10 rebounds and nine assists in a game.
 Occurred in playoffs.
 Only pair of teammates in NBA history to each have at least 40 points in the same game, multiple times.
 They have achieved this four times.
 One of two pairs of teammates in NBA history to each win the scoring title in consecutive years.
 Paul Arizin and Neil Johnston were the first to achieve this in 1952 and 1953.
 One of three pairs of teammates in NBA history with a 50-point game and a 40-point game in the same game.
 Kiki Vandeweghe 51 points, Alex English 47 points; Denver Nuggets vs. Detroit Pistons, December 13, 1983 (3 OT) (highest scoring game in NBA history)
 George Gervin 50 points, Mike Mitchell 45 points; San Antonio Spurs vs. Milwaukee Bucks, March 6, 1982 (3 OT)
 One of four pairs of teammates in NBA history to have one player score at least 30 points in the same playoff game in which his teammate had at least 25 points and 15 assists, twice.
 Includes Kareem Abdul-Jabbar and Magic Johnson, Karl Malone and John Stockton, and Amar'e Stoudemire and Steve Nash.

Oklahoma City Thunder franchise records and achievements

Regular season

Career
Career records cited from Basketball Reference's Oklahoma City Thunder Career Leaders page unless noted otherwise
1st all-time in points: 18,8441st all-time in free throws made: 4,6241st all-time in free throws attempted: 5,8441st all-time in assist percentage: 42.01st all-time in usage percentage: 32.71st all-time in box plus/minus: 6.62nd all-time in defensive rebounds: 4,378Behind Jack Sikma.
2nd all-time in games with a double double: 253Behind Shawn Kemp.
2nd all-time in minutes played: 28,293Behind Gary Payton.
2nd all-time in field goals made: 6,619Behind Gary Payton.
2nd all-time in field goals attempted: 15,243Behind Gary Payton.
2nd all-time in assists: 6,880Behind Gary Payton.
2nd all-time in offensive box plus/minus: 5.2Behind Ray Allen.
2nd all-time in value over replacement player: 52.7Behind Gary Payton.
2nd all-time in 3-point field goals attempted: 2,992Behind Kevin Durant.
3rd all-time in 3-point field goals made: 921Behind Kevin Durant and Rashard Lewis.
3rd all-time in steals: 1,441Behind Gary Payton & Nate McMillan.
3rd all-time in offensive win shares: 53.8Behind Gary Payton & Kevin Durant.
3rd all-time in total win shares: 85.6Behind Gary Payton & Kevin Durant.
3rd all-time in total rebounds: 5,749Behind Jack Sikma and Shawn Kemp.
4th all-time in games played: 820Behind Gary Payton, Fred Brown and Nick Collison.
4th all-time in defensive win shares: 31.8Behind Jack Sikma, Gary Payton & Shawn Kemp.
6th all-time in personal fouls: 2,058Behind Gary Payton, Nick Collison, Jack Sikma, Nate McMillan and Shawn Kemp.
Games with 50+ points: 5Games with 40+ points: 29Behind Kevin Durant.
Games with 30+ points: 113Behind Kevin Durant.
Games with 15+ assists: 19Behind Nate McMillan.
Games with 10+ assists: 164Behind Gary Payton.
Games with a triple-double: 182SeasonTriple-doublesGames with a triple-double: 42Games with a triple-double in one calendar month: 7Consecutive games with a triple-double: 11 (January 22-February 14, 2019)AssistsGames with 15+ assists: 12Games with 10+ assists: 50Consecutive games with 10+ assists: 8''' (March 22-April 5, 2017)

References

External links
Player Profile at NBA.com
Player Profile at ESPN.com

Westbrook